Ektor Nasiokas of Panagiotis (Petrochori, Karditsa, 19 January 1952) is a Greek doctor, writer and politician who acted as Governor of Imathia from 1993 to 1995, was elected MP for Larisa with PASOK four times in the 2000 – 2009 period and acted as Assistant to the Minister of Health and Welfare from 2001 to 2004. In 2011 he resigned from Parliament, leaving PASOK, and he ran as an independent in the 2014 Larisa municipal elections. He is married to professor Maria Korlou and is the father of three children.

References 

Greek oncologists
Greek pathologists
Greek writers
MPs of Larissa
Greek MPs 2000–2004
Greek MPs 2004–2007
Greek MPs 2007–2009
Greek MPs 2009–2012
1952 births
Living people
People from Karditsa (regional unit)